Mike Parr  is an Australian performance artist and printmaker. Parr's works have been exhibited in Australia and internationally, including in Brazil, Cuba, France, Germany, Hungary, Japan, Korea, Taiwan and the United States.

In the 1970s, he co-founded the artist cooperative Inhibodress with Peter Kennedy and Tim Johnson.

Early life and education
Parr spent his childhood in rural Queensland. He is the brother of installation/photography artist, Julie Rrap (formerly Julie Brown-Rrap). He was born with a misshapen arm, and this physical characteristic has featured within his art work.

Parr commenced an arts/law degree at the University of Queensland in 1965, but discontinued his studies the following year. He  moved to Sydney and, in 1968, briefly enrolled at the National Art School to study painting.

Career
In 1970, with  Peter Kennedy (born 1945) and Tim Johnson, Parr established "Inhibodress", an artist cooperative and alternative space for conceptual art, performance art and video art, after the Tin Sheds had paved the way for such spaces. It was an important space for artists from 1971 to 1972. 

Parr's performances explore physical limits, memory and subjectivity. They often depict self-mutilation or extreme physical feats (as in the case of 100 Breaths). The performances are documented photographically and on video.

Parr's printmaking is a striking contrast, both emotionally and visually, to his video/installation work, consisting of beautiful etchings featuring a barrage of raw and spiky lines. Parr has been fascinated with observation and the possibilities and responses of memory distortions. His "landscape" prints are such depictions – memories of views passed by.

Of his reasons, he states "I started drawing in 1981 because around that time I stopped doing the body art performances that I'd done throughout the 1970s", though later he returned to physical performance.

Works
Parr's early works were designed to get a reaction from the audience, though he also focused on exploring questions of identity, memory, and states of being. He particularly used his body as a performative tool, often using his prosthetic arm and testing the physical limits of his body through endurance challenges.

For one of Parr's earlier works, he sat in front of his audience and began talking to them in a conversational manner, then very suddenly brandishes an axe and begins hacking into his prosthetic arm which he had filled with minced meat and fake blood. Most of the people in the audience were not aware of his disability, and therefore shock factor was the main aim.

In the late 60s, Parr's performances were started with "psychotic" episodes in which he cut and attacked his body, which he cites as "psychotic operation(s)".

In 1971 he began to write his book Programmes & Investigations, in which he recorded grotesque performance ideas, including letting a dog drink the performer's blood and sewing a fish onto one's skin.  By 1973, he had listed over 150 different ideas, performing the actions as he wrote them down, and it became the basis for his activity for more than a decade.

In 1981 Parr stopped performing and began painting and printmaking, later returning to performance art in the 90s.

In 2002, Parr's most challenging performance, "For Water from the Mouth" was held at the gallery Artspace – a work of ten whole days where Parr was isolated in a room with no human contact, and nothing but water to keep him alive. His every action was surveyed by surveillance cameras and broadcast live on the Internet for 24 hours a day.

"A stitch in time" was another of his performances, a live web cam showing Parr having his lips and face extensively stitched with thread into a caricature of shame.

In 2003, one of Parr's extended performances was as live web broadcast received more than 250,000 hits in the first 24 hours alone. For 30 hours Parr sat in a gallery (again at Artspace) with his non-prosthetic arm nailed to the wall in opposition to the Australia government's treatment of refugees and asylum seekers. This was called "Malevich (A Political Arm)".

In June, 2018, he had himself interred in a room constructed below a street in Hobart, Tasmania, for 72 hours, sustained only by water and soup. This was to highlight the fate of Aboriginal Tasmanians, among other issues. Metaphorically, the issues (as represented by Parr) are buried but are still there, ready to resurface at inconvenient times; including colonialism and communal and personal histories.

His work was included in the March 2020 Adelaide Biennial of Australian Art at the Art Gallery of South Australia, which is titled "Monster Theatres".

Exhibitions

Selected Solo Exhibitions
1970 Light Pieces & Painted Constructions, Reid Gallery, Brisbane
1972-3 Trans-Art 1: Idea Demonstrations (with Peter Kennedy), Inhibodress Gallery, Sydney; Veste Sagrada and Museo de Arte Moderna, Rio de Janeiro, Brazil
1973 Performance, Actions, Videosystems, Galerie Impact, Lausanne; Galerie Media, Neuchâtel, Switzerland
1978 Screening of Rules and Displacement Activities Parts I and II, lectures, Bela Balaczs Studio for Experimental Film, Budapest, Hungary
1983 Black Box: The Theatre of Self Correction, Part 2, The Performance Space, Sydney
Cloacal Corridor (O Vio Prote/O Vio Proto/O Vio Loto/O Thethe) Self Portrait as a Pair or Self Portrait as a Pun, drawing installation; Identification Number 1 (Rib Markings in the Carnarvon Ranges, North-West Queensland), January 1975, photoseries
Screenings of Rules and Displacement Activities Parts I, II and III; Performance presentation from George Brecht's WaterYam, Institute of Modern Art, Brisbane. Curator: Barbara Campbell
Drawings, Art Projects, Melbourne
1984 Towards the Other Side (Self Quotations), three drawing series, Royal Melbourne Institute of Technology Gallery, Melbourne. Curator: John Smithies
1985 Portage, Roslyn Oxley9 Gallery, Sydney; Fine Art Gallery, University of Tasmania, Hobart
1986 The Parting of the Red Sea, Siegal Contemporary Art Inc., New York
1989 Mike Parr, Roslyn Oxley9 Gallery, Sydney, June; City Gallery, Melbourne, July; Milburn + Arté Gallery, Brisbane
1990 I think of Drypoint in terms of Braille and Excavation, survey of prints from 1988–1990, The Drill Hall Gallery, National Gallery of Australia, Canberra
1991 Mike Parr, Artist in Residence 1990–1991, Ian Potter Gallery, The University of Melbourne Museum of Art, Melbourne
3 Installations, City Gallery, Melbourne; Mike Parr, Roslyn Oxley9 Gallery, Sydney
Survey of Recent Work, Art Gallery of New South Wales, Sydney; Perth Institute of Contemporary Art, Perth
1992 Alphabet/Haemorrhage, 17 performances, Arthouse, Perth, 3 April; 4 performances, Institute of Modern Art, Brisbane, 6 May; 4 performances, City Gallery, Melbourne, 13 June; 9 performances, Museum of Contemporary Art, Sydney, 4 August
1993 Mike Parr, Roslyn Oxley9 Gallery, Sydney, September
Black Mirror/Pale Fire, Various Routes, Whistle/White, 3 performances, Ivan Dougherty Gallery, University of New South Wales, Sydney
1994 Mike Parr, Anna Schwartz Gallery, Melbourne
Echolalia (the road): Prints from the Self Portrait Project: Mike Parr 1987–1994, National Gallery of Victoria, Melbourne
100 Breaths/100 Songs from (ALPHABET/ HAEMORRHAGE) Black Box of 100 Self Portrait Etchings 5, 1993–1994, performance, Art Gallery of South Australia, Adelaide
Fathers 11 (The Law of the Image), installation, Experimental Art Foundation, Adelaide
The Bridge, performance, Art Gallery of New South Wales, Sydney
1995 The Illusion of the End, Sherman Galleries Goodhope and Hargrave, Sydney
Day Break, performance, Scene Shop at the Cultural Centre of Manila, Manila
1996 The Infinity Machine, Sherman Galleries Goodhope, Sydney Anna Schwartz Gallery, Melbourne
Head on a Plate, New York Studio School, New York
The White Hybrid (Fading), performance, Artspace, Cowper Wharf/Artspace, Sydney
Unword, performance, University of Western Australia
1997 Anna Schwartz Gallery, Melbourne
1998 Anna Schwartz Gallery, Melbourne Michael Milburn Galleries, Brisbane
Female Factory, 7 hour performance, 25.4 Australian Centre for Contemporary Art, Melbourne
Blood Box, 24-hour performance, 6.9/7.9, Artspace, Sydney
Boubialla Couta, (performance), College of Fine Arts, Sydney
The Rest of Time, Sherman Galleries Goodhope, Sydney
Mike Parr, Sherman Galleries Hargrave, Sydney
Photo-Realism, Anna Schwartz Gallery, Melbourne
1999 Deep Sleep [The Analytical Disabling of Mind and Matter], Nixon/Parr, 72-hour performance, 17.6–20.6, National Portrait Gallery & Lake Burley Griffin, Canberra
Wrong Face, Anna Schwartz Gallery, Melbourne
Three Collaborations, Sarah Cottier Gallery, Sydney
2000 ARCO, International Contemporary Art Fair, Parque Serial Juan Carosl, Madrid
Shallow Grave, 3-day performance, 7.7–9.7 12th Biennale of Sydney, Art Gallery of New South Wales, Sydney

Selected Group Exhibitions
1971 The Situation Now, Contemporary Art Society, Central Street Gallery, Sydney
John Kaldor Art Project 2: Szeemann: I want to leave a nice welldone child here (20 Australian Artists), Bonython Gallery, Sydney; National Gallery of Victoria, Melbourne
1973 Artists' Books, Philadelphia Museum of Art
Recent Australian Art, Art Gallery of New South Wales, Sydney
1977 10th biennale de Paris, Musée d'Art Moderne de la Ville de Paris
1979 3rd Biennale of Sydney: European Dialogue, Art Gallery of New South Wales, Sydney
1980 XXXIX Biennale di Venezia, Giardini, Venice
1981 Australian Perspecta 1981: A biennial survey of contemporary Australian art, Art Gallery of New South Wales, Sydney
1982 Eureka! Artists from Australia, Institute of Contemporary Art and Serpentine Gallery, London
1983 Presence & Absence: Survey of Contemporary Australian Art, No. 1, installation, Art Gallery of Western Australia, Perth
Tall Poppies, an exhibition of five pictures, University Art Gallery, University of Melbourne
D'un autre continent 'L'Australie, Le réve et le réel', ARC/Musée d'Art Moderne de la Ville de Paris
1984-5 An Australian Accent, Three Artists, Mike Parr, Imants Tillers, Ken Unsworth, P.S.1 (Project Studios One), The Institute of Art and Urban Resources, Inc., New York; Corcoran Gallery of Art, Washington; Art Gallery of Western Australia, Perth; Art Gallery of New South Wales, Sydney
An International Survey of Recent Painting and Sculpture, The Museum of Modern Art, New York
1985 5/5, Fünf Vom Fünften, daadgalerie, Berlin
Australian Perspecta 85,Art Gallery of New South Wales, Sydney
1986 Prospect '86, An International Exhibition of Contemporary Art, Frankfurter Kunstverein, Schirn Kunsthalle, Frankfurt
Origins, Originality & Beyond, The Sixth Biennale of Sydney, Art Gallery of New South Wales; Pier 2/3, Walsh Bay, Sydney
1987-9 The Australian Bicentennial Perspecta, Art Gallery of New South Wales, Sydney; Art Gallery of Western Australia, Perth; Frankfurter Kunstverein, Steirnernes Haus, Frankfurt; Württemburgischer Kunstverein, Stuttgart
1988 1988 Australian Biennale. From the Southern Cross: A View of World Art c.1940–1988, The Seventh Biennale of Sydney, Art Gallery of New South Wales; Pier 2/3, Walsh Bay, Sydney; National Gallery of Victoria, Melbourne
Edge to Edge: Australian Contemporary Art to Japan, National Museum of Art, Osaka; Old and New Hara Museums, Tokyo; Nagoya City Museum, Nagoya; Hokkaido Museum, Sapporo
1994 Adelaide Installations, the 1994 Adelaide Biennial of Australian Art, Adelaide
1995 Antipodean Currents: 10 Contemporary Artists from Australia, Guggenheim Museum SoHo, New York
1996 Systems End: Contemporary Art in Australia, OXY Gallery, Osaka; Hakone Open-Air Museum, Tokyo; Dong-Ah Gallery, Seoul, Korea
Spirit & Place: Art in Australia 1861–1996, Museum of Contemporary Art, Sydney
1997 Dead Sun, Art Gallery of New South Wales. Curator: Mike Parr; Dead Sun, performance, Art Gallery of New South Wales
Body, Art Gallery of New South Wales
In Place (Out of Time): Contemporary Art in Australia, Museum of Modern Art, Oxford; Art Gallery of Western Australia, Perth
1998 Wounds: Between Democracy and Redemption in Contemporary Art, Moderna Museet, Stockholm, Sweden
Southern Reflections: An Exhibition of Contemporary Australian Art to Northern Europe, Kulturhaus, Stockholm, Sweden; Konathallen Götsberg, Gothenburg, Sweden; Arhus Konstmuseum, Arhus, Denmark; Museum Tamminiementle (City Art Museum), Helsinki; Neues Museum, Bremen, Germany; Staatliche Sammlung für Kunst, Chemnitz, East Germany
Telling Tales, Ivan Dougherty Gallery, University of New South Wales, Sydney
1999 Southern Reflections: Ten Contemporary Australian Artists, touring Northern Europe Other Stories: Five Australian Artists, Hokkaido Museum of Modern Art, Sapporo, Japan
Five Continents and One City. Curator: Gao Minglu, Mexico City Gallery, Mexico The Liverpool Biennale, Liverpool, UK
Global Conceptualism: Points of Origin, Queens Museum, The Walker Art Centre, Miami Art Centre and other American Museums, 1999/00
2000 The 12th Biennale of Sydney, Sydney Biennale 2000, Art Gallery of New South Wales; Museum of Contemporary Art; Artspace and other venues

Awards
 1990 Joint acquisitive Winner of the Fremantle Print Award

Collections
National Gallery of Australia, the Museum of Contemporary Art in Sydney, all state and many regional galleries, tertiary collections, the National Library in Canberra, Parliament House, Canberra, Chartwell Collection in New Zealand, Chase Manhattan Bank in New York, First National Bank in Chicago, The Michael Buxton Contemporary Australian Art Collection, Art Gallery of Ballarat

References

External links
 Art Gallery Of New South Wales – interview with Parr
 short bio – National Gallery Australia
 Art Gallery Of Western Australia
 a r t s p a c e – a description of one of his performance artworks with audience interaction
 Description of Malevich (A political arm), with photos.
  Design & Art Australia Online- Mike Parr

Living people
1945 births
Artists from Sydney
Australian performance artists
Australian printmakers
Australian contemporary artists